Bethesda Episcopal Church is an Episcopal Church in Saratoga Springs, New York.

The parish was incorporated in 1830. In 1841 it purchased the site of its present church at 41 Washington Street. Architect Richard Upjohn drew up plans for the church in English Gothic style, and construction was begun in 1842.  The first services were held in the building in 1844.

Side aisles were added in 1856. In 1886 Mrs. Rockwell Putnam, widow of the owner of the Grand Union Hotel in Saratoga Springs, donated money for construction of a tower in memory of her late husband.  Architect A. Page Brown designed the additions in Norman Romanesque style. The work was completed in 1887. A notable feature of the renovation was the addition of Tiffany windows in the front facade.

The church is listed in the National Register of Historic Places as a contributing property of the Broadway Historic District in Saratoga Springs.

See also
National Register of Historic Places listings in Saratoga County, New York

References

External links
 

Episcopal church buildings in New York (state)
Churches in Saratoga County, New York
Buildings and structures in Saratoga Springs, New York
1841 establishments in New York (state)
Historic district contributing properties in New York (state)
19th-century Episcopal church buildings
National Register of Historic Places in Saratoga County, New York
Churches on the National Register of Historic Places in New York (state)